4 is the second album by Supersilent, released on January 12, 1998, through Rune Grammofon.

Track listing

Personnel 
Supersilent
Arve Henriksen – trumpet, live electronics
Helge Sten – live electronics, production, mixing, recording
Ståle Storløkken – keyboards
Jarle Vespestad – drums
Production and additional personnel
Kim Hiorthøy – cover art
Audun Strype – mastering
Supersilent – production

References

External links 
 

1998 albums
Supersilent albums